The 1903–04 Harvard Crimson men's ice hockey season was the seventh season of play for the program.

Season
A year after graduating, Alfred Winsor returned to Harvard as the program's first full-time head coach. Windsor's return didn't change anything for the Crimson as they again won all of their games and claimed their second consecutive Intercollegiate championship. Princeton was forced to forfeit the game against Harvard on January 23 due to the Tigers being unable to participate. This game was only counted as a forfeit for the Intercollegiate Hockey Association standings.

Roster

Standings

Schedule and Results

|-
!colspan=12 style=";" | Regular Season

Scoring Statistics

Note: Assists were not recorded as a statistic.

References

Harvard Crimson men's ice hockey seasons
Harvard
Harvard
Harvard
Harvard
Harvard